Armudlu, Azerbaijan may refer to:
 Armudlu, Kalbajar, Azerbaijan
 Armudlu, Qakh, Azerbaijan